West Lothian Council is the local authority for the council area of West Lothian in Scotland.

History
West Lothian District Council was created in 1975 as one of four districts within the Lothian region. The West Lothian district took its name from the historic county of West Lothian, which had covered a similar but not identical area. The Lothian region was abolished in 1996, when the four districts in the region, including West Lothian, became unitary council areas.

Political control
The first election to the West Lothian District Council was held in 1974, initially operating as a shadow authority alongside the outgoing authorities until the new system came into force on 16 May 1975. A shadow authority was again elected in 1995 ahead of the reforms which came into force on 1 April 1996. Political control of the council since 1975 has been as follows:

West Lothian District Council

West Lothian Council

Leadership
The leaders of the council since 1996 have been:

Elections
Since 2007 elections have been held every five years under the single transferable vote system, introduced by the Local Governance (Scotland) Act 2004. Election results since 1995 have been as follows:

Premises

The council is based at the West Lothian Civic Centre in Livingston. The building was built in 2009 at a cost of £50 million to serve as a police headquarters and courthouse as well as offices for the council. Prior to 2009 the council's offices had been divided between various buildings, including:
County Buildings in Linlithgow, which had been built in 1935 as the headquarters for the old West Lothian County Council.
Lindsay House on South Bridge Street, Bathgate, built in 1966 as the Burgh Chambers for the old Bathgate Town Council.
West Lothian House on Almondvale Boulevard in Livingston, which had been built in 1981 as Sidlaw House and had been the headquarters of the Livingston Development Corporation.
Lindsay House and West Lothian House were both demolished shortly after the new Civic Centre opened in 2009.

Services
Like all Scottish Councils, West Lothian Council provides services such as Education, Social Work, Housing, Highways, Street lighting and Cleansing.

The council is responsible for the co-ordination of the planning and provision of public services in West Lothian. It works closely with other public bodies such as police, fire and health, through its community planning partnership.

West Lothian Council operates country parks at Beecraigs, Polkemmet, and Almondell & Calderwood.

Wards

During elections West Lothian Council is divided geographically into 9 wards which then elect either three or four councillors each by the Single Transferable Vote system. The electoral system of local councils in Scotland is governed by the Local Governance (Scotland) Act 2004, an Act of the Scottish Parliament which first introduced proportional representation to councils. These electoral wards are as follows:

References

External links
West Lothian Council web site

Local authorities of Scotland
Politics of West Lothian
Organisations based in West Lothian
Livingston, West Lothian